William Cooke (18 March 1868 – 21 November 1954) was a New Zealand cricketer. He played in two first-class matches for Canterbury in 1891/92.

See also
 List of Canterbury representative cricketers

References

External links
 

1868 births
1954 deaths
New Zealand cricketers
Canterbury cricketers
Cricketers from Christchurch